Nataliya is the Ukrainian and Russian form of the female given name Natalia. A diminutive form is Natalka (see: Natalka Poltavka).

People with the given name Nataliya 
Nataliya Berkut (born 1975), Ukrainian long-distance runner
Nataliya Borysenko (born 1975), Ukrainian team handball player
Nataliya Burdeyna (born 1974), Ukrainian archer
Nataliya Dmytruk (born 1957), former sign language interpreter on the Ukrainian state-run channel UT1 news broadcasts
Nataliya Dobrynska (born 1982), Ukrainian heptathlete
Nataliya Donchenko (1932–2022), Soviet speed skater
Nataliya Gotsiy (born 1985), Ukrainian fashion model
Nataliya Lyapina (born 1976), Ukrainian team handball player
Nataliya Matryuk (born 1959), Ukrainian former handball player
Nataliya Medvedeva (1958–2003), Russian singer, poet and writer
Nataliya Misyulya (born 1966), retired female race walker from Belarus
Nataliya Pohrebnyak (born 1988), Ukrainian track and field sprint athlete
Nataliya Petrivna Zubytska, née Yushchenko (born 1942), Ukrainian herbalist and healer
Nataliya Pyhyda (born 1981), Ukrainian track and field sprint athlete
Nataliya Rusnachenko (born 1969), Ukrainian former handball player
Nataliya Skakun (born 1981), Ukrainian weightlifter and Olympic gold medallist
Nataliya Tobias (born 1980), Ukrainian middle-distance runner who specializes in the 1500 metres
Nataliya Tymoshkina (born 1952), former Soviet/Ukrainian handball player
Nataliya Vitrenko (born 1951), Ukrainian politician and scientist
Nataliya Yermolovich (born 1964), retired female javelin thrower
Nataliya Zinchenko (born 1979), Ukrainian football player
Nataliya Zolotukhina (born 1985), Ukrainian hammer thrower

See also
 Natalya, female given name
 , female given name

Russian feminine given names
Ukrainian feminine given names